Shikhobalovo is a rural locality (a selo) in Nebylovskoye Rural Settlement, Yuryev-Polsky District, Vladimir Oblast, Russia. The population was 993 as of 2010.

Geography 
Shikhobalovo is located 36 km southeast of Yuryev-Polsky (the district's administrative centre) by road. Bogdanovskoye is the nearest rural locality.

References 

Rural localities in Yuryev-Polsky District
Suzdalsky Uyezd